The MAE 323 is a family of Italian aircraft engines, designed and produced by Modena Avio Engines (commonly called MAE) of Rubiera for use in light aircraft.

The company seems to have been founded about 2003 and gone out of business by 2015. Since 2012 its website has consisted only of a placeholder page.

Design and development
The engine is a three-cylinder in radial-configuration, four-stroke,  displacement, liquid-cooled, gasoline engine design, with a mechanical gearbox reduction drive with a reduction ratio of 1.91:1. It employs dual electronic ignition systems and has a compression ratio of 9.0:1.

Variants
MAE 323
MAE 323 R

Specifications (MAE 323)

See also

References

External links

Official website archives on Archive.org 

Modena Avio Engines aircraft engines
Liquid-cooled aircraft piston engines
2000s aircraft piston engines